Qarah Aghaj (also Romanized as Qarah Āghāj and Qareh Āghāj; also known as Ghareh Aghaj, Karaagach, Qara Agāch, and Qareh Āqāch) is a village in Chelleh Khaneh Rural District, Sufian District, Shabestar County, East Azerbaijan Province, Iran. At the 2006 census, its population was 470, in 118 families.

References 

Populated places in Shabestar County